Deadly Reunion is a BBC Books original novel written by Terrance Dicks and Barry Letts and based on the long-running British science fiction television series Doctor Who. It features the Third Doctor, Jo, and UNIT.

This novel celebrates the 40th anniversary of Doctor Who.

References

2003 British novels
2003 science fiction novels
Past Doctor Adventures
Third Doctor novels
Novels by Terrance Dicks
Novels by Barry Letts
The Master (Doctor Who) novels
British science fiction novels
BBC Books books